American Look is a 1969 album by the Swingle Singers on the Philips Records label.  All tracks from this album are also included on the 11 disk Philips boxed set, Swingle Singers.

Track listing
Country Dances (invention for vocal ensemble: "Arkansas Traveller" / "College Hornpipe" / "Devil's Dream" / "Old Zip Coon" / "Virginia Reel" / "Pop Goes the Weasel") – 2:15
"When Jesus Wept" (William Billings) – 2:07
Negro Spirituals (for vocal ensemble: "Joshua Fit the Battle of Jericho" / "Swing Low, Sweet Chariot" / "Little David" / "Deep River") – 3:52
Patriotic Songs (invention for vocal ensemble: "Dixie" / "Yankee Doodle" / "Battle Hymn of the Republic") – 2:07
"He's Gone Away" (trad.) – 2:12
"Saint's Fugue" (based on "When the Saints Go Marchin' In" for vocal ensemble) (Swingle) – 2:18
Stephen Foster Medley: "Old Folks at Home"; "Beautiful Dreamer"; "Camptown Races"; "Jeannie with the Light Brown Hair" (Foster) – 3:26
from the opera, Porgy and Bess (Gershwin):
"My Man's Gone Now" – 2:51
"It Ain't Necessarily So" – 1:59
"Summertime" – 1:58
"I Got Plenty of Nothin'" – 2:03
"Bess You Is My Woman" – 2:40

Personnel
Vocals:
Christiane Legrand – soprano
Nicole Darde – soprano
Hélène Devos – alto
Claudine Meunier – alto
Ward Swingle – tenor, arranger
Joseph Noves – tenor
Jean Cussac – bass
José Germain – bass
Rhythm section:
Jacky Cavallero – double bass
Roger Fugen – drums

References / external links

Philips 6311.007, Philips 8262016
American Look at [ Allmusic.com]

The Swingle Singers albums
1969 albums
Philips Records albums